Al-Ahgaff University (Arabic: جامعة الأحقاف) is a university located in Mukalla, Yemen. It was established in 1995. It is accredited by Ministry of Higher Education and Scientific Research, Yemen. The university offers both undergraduate and postgraduate courses.

References

External links 
 

Universities in Yemen
Educational institutions established in 1995
1995 establishments in Yemen